Murphy's law is a popular adage regarding misfortune.

Murphy's Law may also refer to:

Film and television
 Murphy's Law (film), a 1986 action thriller featuring Charles Bronson
 Murphy's Law (American TV series), a 1988–1989 American television crime comedy-drama
 Murphy's Law (British TV series), a 2001–2007 British television police drama
 Milo Murphy's Law, a 2016 Disney XD series
 Murphy's Law of Love, a 2015 Taiwanese romantic comedy television series
 "Murphy's Law", an episode of The 100

Music
 Murphy's Law (band), a hardcore punk band from New York
 Murphy's Law (Murphy's Law album), their 1986 album
 Murphy's Law (Murphy Lee album), 2003
 "Murphy's Law" (Chéri song), 1982
 "Murphy's Law" (Róisín Murphy song), 2020
 "Murphy's Law", a song by Priestess from the album Prior to the Fire

Other uses
 Murphy's Law (novel), Colin Bateman novel based on the British TV series

See also 

 Muphry's law, with similar title, applying to proof-reading
 Murfy's fLaw, a rock band from Kenya